Kareem Blake (born March 27, 1975), better known by his stage name Choclair, is a Canadian rapper. He was one of the most successful Canadian rappers in Canada in the late 1990s and early 2000s. Choclair has been nominated for six Juno Awards, winning four.

Career
Blake, of Jamaican descent, was born in Scarborough, Ontario, in east Toronto. Starting at the age of 11, he followed in his older brother's footsteps, and decided to become a rapper. Blake attended St. John Paul II Catholic Secondary School, which is when he first started performing under the name "Choclair". In 1995, he released his debut single, "Twenty One Years", on his own independent label, Knee Deep Records. In 1997, he released the EP What It Takes, which was accompanied by a music video featuring Jully Black. What It Takes won the "Best Rap Recording" award at the 1997 Juno Awards. By 1998, Choclair had released eleven records, including the first international releases for Saukrates, Kardinal Offishall, Jully Black, Solitair, Marvel, and Tara Chase from Toronto's music scene.

Choclair, with the Rascalz, contributed to the hip hop song "Northern Touch",  which received two Juno Awards and a MuchMusic Video Award, and achieved lasting popularity among Canadian hip hop fans and has been labelled by critics as a "hiphop anthem".

Choclair then expanded his team and joined Virgin Music Canada in July 1998. In 1999, he signed with Priority Records, and released his debut album Ice Cold, produced by Saukrates. The album was certified gold in Canada (50,000 copies) and spawned the hit single "Let's Ride", produced by Kardinal Offishall. Let's Ride reached #38 on the Canadian RPM Singles Chart.

Ice Cold won the Juno award for "Best Rap Recording" in 2000. Later that year, "Let's Ride" won a SOCAN award and a MuchMusic award.  He was presented with a 2001 Urban Music award from SOCAN. Also in 2001 he opened the Music Without Borders concert at the Air Canada Centre in Toronto.

On March 5, 2002, Choclair released his next album, Memoirs of Blake Savage, which included a lot of drug-related lyrics. He released the single "Skunk" from that album, which featured Kurupt of Tha Dogg Pound.

After parting ways with Virgin Music, Choclair started his own independent label Greenhouse Music in partnership with Sextant Records/EMI Music Canada. On June 17, 2003, he released the album Flagrant, which won a Juno Award as best rap recording in 2004. He also released other Canadian hip hop albums in conjunction with Sextant Records and EMI. Greenhouse followed that with the release of My Demo, a collection of Choclair's early underground recordings.

In 2006, Choclair released the album, Flagship. He was also featured on Karl Wolf's single, "Desensitize".

In 2018, Choclair and other members of the team who recorded "Northern Touch" performed the song at the 2018 Juno Awards ceremony. Also in 2018, Choclair joined Classified and Maestro Fresh-Wes on the "Canadian Classic Tour".

Discography

Albums
Ice Cold (1999)
Memoirs of Blake Savage (2002)
Flagrant (2003)
My Demo (2003)
Flagship (2006)

EPs
What It Takes (1997)

Singles

References

External links
Choclair's Official Website
Choclair at MySpace
Smooth as Choclair — Canadian hip hop artist reveals the secrets of seduction — by Denise Ing, Varsity Staff
Word Magazine Article
NOW Magazine Article
College Newspaper Interview
Choclair Brings Canadian Hip-Hop On U.S. Tour

1975 births
Living people
People from Scarborough, Toronto
Canadian people of Jamaican descent
Black Canadian musicians
Canadian male rappers
Rappers from Toronto
Priority Records artists
Virgin Records artists
Juno Award for Rap Recording of the Year winners
20th-century Canadian rappers
21st-century Canadian rappers
20th-century Canadian male musicians
21st-century Canadian male musicians